Jen Cloher is the fourth studio album by Australian musician Jen Cloher. It was released in August 2017 under Milk! Records and peaked at number 5 on the ARIA Charts.

Reception
Junkee said the album was, "the magnum opus of one of our finest Australian poets. The 11 songs contained within know exactly what they want to say, and exactly how they’re going to say it, no more so than "Regional Echo". A lament about the state of Australian suburbs that slowly shifts into a love letter dedicated to future possibility, it’s a melancholy masterpiece."

Spectrum Culture said, "With lashes of punk grit and glimmers of shoegaze buoyed by politically and emotionally engaged lyrics, Jen Cloher has all of the makings of being one of the more notable indie rock releases of the year.""

Accolades

Track listing

Charts

Release history

References

2017 albums